Ramsey Forty Foot is a village in Ramsey  civil parish, part of the Huntingdonshire district of Cambridgeshire, England. It lies on the Forty Foot Drain. The settlement has a village hall, which also contains the village's war memorial. The memorial was previously located in a now-demolished tin tabernacle-type church dedicated to St Felix.

References

Villages in Cambridgeshire
Ramsey, Cambridgeshire